"Baby Baby" is a song by South Korean girl group Girls' Generation, released on March 17, 2008, through SM Entertainment as the lead single off of the repackaged edition of their debut studio album Girls' Generation, also titled Baby Baby.

Release
It was the lead single of the repackage of Girls' Generation, titled Baby Baby who was released on March 17, 2008. The album was released in two versions, each edition features the same contents, however the cover art used for one of them was used as back cover for the other one, and the other way around. A MV for "Baby Baby" was released as well, containing scenes of the Making of video of the Girls' Generation MV, and footage of the girls working on their first album.

The song was written and produced by Hwang Seong Je (BJJ) and Yoo Jenny.

Promotion
Girls' Generation had their comeback performance on Music Bank, on March 21, 2008. The group also performed "Baby Baby" on various music shows such as Music Core, Inkigayo and M! Countdown in March and April.

The album promotions was concluded on April 13, 2008, at Inkigayo.

Music video
The music video for "Baby Baby" was released on March 17. The Music Video consists of behind the scene footage from other music videos.

Track listing

Awards and nominations

Music programs awards

Credits and personnel
 Girls' Generation – vocals
 Taeyeon – main vocals, background vocals
 Jessica – main vocals, background vocals
 Sunny – lead vocals
 Tiffany – lead vocals
 Hyoyeon – sub-vocals
 Yuri –  vocals
 Sooyoung – sub-vocals
 Yoona –  lead vocals
 Seohyun –  lead vocals
 Hwang Seong Je (BJJ) – producing, songwriting, arranger, music
 Yoo Jenny – songwriting

References

External links
 "Baby Baby" Music Video

2008 singles
Dance-pop songs
Girls' Generation songs
SM Entertainment singles
Korean-language songs
2008 songs